Daran or Darran may refer to:

People

Given name Daran 
 Daran Boonyasak (born 1979), Thai actress
 Daran Kravanh, Cambodian-American musician and politician
 Daran Little (born 1966), BAFTA Award-winning British television writer
 Daran Norris (born 1964), American actor
 Daran Ponter (born 1968), New Zealand regional politician

Given name Darran 
 Darran Harris (born 1992), Welsh rugby union player
 Darran Hay (born 1969), English footballer
 Darran Kempson (born 1984), English footballer
 Darran Lindsay (1971–2006), Northern Irish motorcycle road racer
 Darran O'Sullivan (born 1986), British-Irish Gaelic footballer
 Darran Rowbotham (born 1966), Welsh footballer
 Darran Thomson (born 1984), Scottish footballer

Places 
 Daran, Azerbaijan, village in the Bilasuvar Rayon
 Darantaleh, a town in the northern Sool region of Somalia
 Darran Mountains, Fiordland, New Zealand
 Darran Valley, community in Wales

Places in Iran 
 Daran, Iran, also Romanized as Dārān, city and capital of Faridan County, Isfahan Province
 Daran, East Azerbaijan, also Romanized as Dārān, also known as Dārānā, village in Jolfa County, East Azerbaijan Province
 Pashneh Daran, also Romanized as Pāshneh Dārān; also known as Pāshneh Dar, Pāshneh Darū, and Pāshteh Darān, a village in Dastgerdan Rural District, Dastgerdan District, Tabas County, South Khorasan Province
 Daran Darreh, also Romanized as Dūrān Darreh, Darrān Darreh, Darān Darreh, Darun Darreh, and Dowrān Darreh, a village in Hemmatabad Rural District, in the Central District of Borujerd County, Lorestan Province

Places in Kerman Province, Iran 
 Dahan-e Daran, also Romanized as Dahan-e Darān; also known as Deh-e Darān, a village in Marz Rural District, Chah Dadkhoda District, Qaleh Ganj County
 Ti Daran, also Romanized as Tī Darān, a village in Nargesan Rural District, Jebalbarez-e Jonubi District, Anbarabad County

See also 
 Seh Daran (disambiguation)
 Deh-e Daran (disambiguation)
Darren
Darin (disambiguation)
Daron
Darron